This page is a list of Brazilian saints, blesseds, venerables, and Servants of God, as recognized by the Roman Catholic Church. These people were born, died, or lived their religious life in Brazil.

The Catholic Church has been present in the territory of the modern nation of Brazil since the first Mass was said there in 1500 and today claims the largest population of Catholics of any country in the world.  Nonetheless, the country has produced few officially canonized saints thus far.

Saints

The following is the list of saints, in the order in which they were canonized.
 Martyrs of Río de la Plata (Rio Grande do Sul, Brazil):
 Roque González y de Santa Cruz (1576–1628), Professed Priest of the Jesuits (Asunción, Paraguay)
 Adolfo Rodríguez Obnel (1598–1628), Professed Priest of the Jesuits (Zamora, Spain)
 Juan del Castillo Rodríguez (1595–1628), Professed Priest of the Jesuits (Cuenca, Spain)
 Venerated: January 15, 1933
 Beatified: January 28, 1934 by Pope Pius XI
 Canonized: May 16, 1988 by Pope John Paul II
 Amabile Visintainer (Paulina of the Agonizing Heart of Jesus) (1865–1942), Founder of the Little Sister of Immaculate Concepcion (Trent, Italy – São Paulo, Brazil)
 Venerated: February 8, 1988
 Beatified: October 18, 1991 by Pope John Paul II
 Canonized: May 19, 2002 by Pope John Paul II
 Antonio Galvao de Franca (Antonio of Saint Anne) (1739–1822), Professed Priest of the Franciscan Friars Minor (São Paulo, Brazil)
 Venerated: March 8, 1997
 Beatified: October 25, 1998 by Pope John Paul II
 Canonized: May 11, 2007 by Pope Benedict XVI
 José de Anchieta (1534–1597), Professed Priest of the Jesuits (Spain-Brazil)
 Venerated: August 10, 1786
 Beatified: June 22, 1980 by Pope John Paul II
 Canonized: April 3, 2014 by Pope Francis
 André de Soveral & 29 Companions (d. 1645), Priests and Laypersons of the Archdiocese of Natal; Martyr (Brazil)
 Venerated: December 21, 1998
 Beatified: March 5, 2000 by Pope John Paul II
 Canonized: October 15, 2017 by Pope Francis
 Maria Rita Lopes Pontes de Souza Brito (Dulce) (1914–1992), Professed Religious of the Missionary Sisters of the Immaculate Conception (Brazil)
 Venerated: April 3, 2009
 Beatified: May 22, 2011 by Cardinal Geraldo Majella Agnelo
 Canonized: October 13, 2019 by Pope Francis

Blesseds
 Inácio de Azevedo and 39 Jesuit Companions (d. 1570), Professed Priests, Religious', Novices and Clerics of the Jesuits; Martyrs (aboard the Santiago toward Santa Cruz de Tenerife, Spain)
 Venerated: n/a
 Beatified: May 11, 1854 by Pope Pius IX
 Hubertus Van Lieshout [Eustachius] (1890–1943), Professed Priest of the Congregation of Sacred Hearts of Jesus and Mary (Picpus) (North Brabant, Netherlands – Minas Gerais, Brazil)
 Venerated: April 12, 2003
 Beatified: June 15, 2006 by Cardinal José Saraiva Martins, C.M.F.
 Mariano de la Mata Aparicio (1905–1983), Professed Priest of the Augustinians (Palenca, Spain – São Paulo, Brazil)
 Venerated: December 20, 2004
 Beatified: November 5, 2006 by Cardinal José Saraiva Martins, C.M.F.
 Albertina Berkenbrock (1919–1931), Child of the Diocese of Tubarão; Martyr (Santa Catarina, Brazil)
 Venerated: December 16, 2006
 Beatified: October 20, 2007 by Cardinal José Saraiva Martins, C.M.F.
 Adílio Daronch (1908–1924), Child of the Diocese of Frederico Westphalen; Martyr (Rio Grande do Sul, Brazil)
 Venerated: December 16, 2006
 Beatified: October 21, 2007 by Cardinal José Saraiva Martins, C.M.F.
 Manuel Gómez González (1877–1924), Priest of the Diocese of Frederico Westphalen; Martyr (Pontevedra, Spain – Rio Grande do Sul, Brazil)
 Venerated: December 16, 2006
 Beatified: October 21, 2007 by Cardinal José Saraiva Martins, C.M.F.
 Lindalva Justo de Oliveira (1953–1993), Vowed Member of the Daughters of Charity of Saint Vincent de Paul; Martyr (Rio Grande do Sul – Bahia, Brazil)
 Venerated: December 16, 2006
 Beatified: December 2, 2007 by Cardinal José Saraiva Martins, C.M.F.
 Bárbara Maix (Maria Barbara of the Holy Trinity) (1818–1873), Founder of the Sisters of the Immaculate Heart of Mary (Vienna, Austria – Rio de Janeiro, Brazil)
 Venerated: July 3, 2008
 Beatified: November 6, 2010 by Archbishop Lorenzo Baldisseri
 Francisca de Paula de Jesus [Nhá Chica] (1810–1895), Laywoman of the Diocese of Campanha (Minas Gerais, Brazil)
 Venerated: January 14, 2011
 Beatified: May 4, 2013 by Cardinal Angelo Amato, S.D.B.
 Assunta Marchetti (1871–1948), Cofoundress of the Missionaries of Saint Charles Borromeo (Scalabrinian Sisters) (Lucca, Italy – São Paulo, Brazil)
 Venerated: December 19, 2011
 Beatified: October 25, 2014 by Cardinal Angelo Amato, S.D.B.
 Francisco de Paula Victor (1827–1905), Priest of the Diocese of Campanha (Minas Gerais, Brazil)
 Venerated: May 10, 2012
 Beatified: November 14, 2015 by Cardinal Angelo Amato, S.D.B.
 Giovanni Schiavo (1903–1967), Professed Priest of the Josephites of Murialdo (Vicenza, Italy – Rio Grande do Sul, Brazil)
 Venerated: December 14, 2015
 Beatified: October 28, 2017 by Cardinal Angelo Amato, S.D.B.
 Donizetti Tavares de Lima (1882–1961), Priest of the Diocese of São João da Boa Vista (Minas Gerais – São Paulo, Brazil)
 Venerated: October 9, 2017
 Beatified: November 23, 2019 by Cardinal Giovanni Angelo Becciu
 Benigna Cardoso da Silva (1928–1941), Child Laywoman of the Diocese of Crato; Martyr (Ceará, Brazil)
 Declared "Venerable": October 2, 2019
 Beatified: October 24, 2022 by Cardinal Leonardo Ulrich Steiner
 Isabel Cristina Mrad Campos (1962–1982), Young Laywoman of the Archdiocese of Mariana; Martyr (Minas Gerais, Brazil)
 Declared "Venerable": October 27, 2020
 Beatified: December 10, 2022 by Cardinal Raymundo Damasceno Assis

Venerables
 Louise-Josephine Voiron [Marie-Theodore] (1835–1925), Professed Religious of the Sisters of Saint Joseph of Chambéry (Savoie, France – São Paulo, Brazil)
 Declared "Venerable": February 18, 1989
 Maria Conchita Farani [Antonieta of Sait Michael the Archangel] (1906–1963), Professed Religious of the Passionist Sisters of Saint Paul of the Cross (Paraná – São Paulo, Brazil)
 Declared "Venerable": June 13, 1992
 Rudolf Komorek (1890–1949), Professed Priest of the Salesians of Don Bosco (Bielsko-Biała, Poland – São Paulo, Brazil)
 Declared "Venerable": April 6, 1995
 Attilio Giordani (1913–1972), Married Layperson of the Archdiocese of Milan; Member of the Salesian Cooperators (Milan, Italy – Mato Grosso do Sul, Brazil)
 Declared "Venerable": October 9, 2013
 Noeme Cinque [Serafina] (1913–1988), Professed Religious of the Adorers of the Blood of Christ (Amazonas, Brazil)
 Declared "Venerable": January 27, 2014
 Maria Dulce Rodrigues dos Santos [Maria Teresa of the Eucharistic Jesus] (1901 - 1972), Founder of the Little Missionary Sisters of Mary Immaculate (São Paulo, Brazil)
 Declared "Venerable": April 3, 2014
 Antônio Ferreira Viçoso (1787–1875),Professed Priest of the Congregation of the Mission (Vincentians); Bishop of Mariana (Lisbon, Portugal – Minas Gerais, Brazil)
 Declared "Venerable": July 8, 2014
 Pelagio Sauter (1878–1961), Professed Priest of the Redemptorists (Zollernalbkreis, Germany – Goiânia, Brazil)
 Declared "Venerable": November 7, 2014
 Giuseppe Marchetti (1869–1896), Professed Priest of the Scalabrinians; Cofounder of the Missionaries of Saint Charles Borromeo (Scalabrinian Sisters) (Lucca, Italy – São Paulo, Brazil)
 Declared "Venerable": July 8, 2016
 Felice Rossini [Daniele of Samarate] (1876–1924), Professed Priest of the Franciscan Capuchins (Varese, Italy – Pará, Brazil)
 Declared "Venerable": March 23, 2017
 Pio Giannotti [Damiano of Bozzano] (1898–1997), Professed Priest of the Franciscan Capuchins (Lucca, Italy – Pernambuco, Brazil)
 Declared "Venerable": April 6, 2019
 Nelson Santana [Nelsinho] (1955 - 1964), Child Layperson of the Diocese of Sao Carlos (São Paulo, Brazil)
 Declared "Venerable": April 6, 2019
 Hermínio Pinzetta [Salvador] (1911–1972), Professed Religious of the Franciscan Capuchins (Rio Grande do Sul, Brazil)
 Declared "Venerable": May 13, 2019
 Dinah Amorim [Maria of the Angels] (1917–1988), Professed Religious of the Daughters of Mary - Escolapias (Minas Gerais – Rio de Janeiro, Brazil)
 Declared "Venerable": December 11, 2019
 Carmen Catarina Bueno [Maria do Carmo of the Holy Trinity] (1898–1966), Professed Religious of the Discalced Carmelite Nuns (São Paulo, Brazil)
 Declared "Venerable": January 23, 2020
 Roberto Giovanni (1903–1994), Professed Religious of the Stigmatines (São Paulo, Brazil)
 Declared "Venerable": October 27, 2020
 Albino Alves da Cunha Silva (1882–1973), Professed Priest of the Diocese of Catanduva (Celorico de Basto – São Paulo, Brazil)
 Declared "Venerable": February 20, 2021
 Odette Vidal de Oliveira [Odetinha] (1930–1939), Child Laywoman of the Archdiocese of São Sebastião do Rio de Janeiro (Rio de Janeiro, Brazil)
 Declared "Venerable": November 25, 2021
 Maria da Conceição Santos [Benigna Victim of Jesus] (1907–1981), Professed Religious of the Sisters Helpers of Our Lady of Mercy (Minas Gerais, Brazil)
 Declared "Venerable": February 18, 2022
 Clemente Recalcati [Giampietro of Sesto San Giovanni] (1868–1913), Professed Priest of the Franciscan Capuchins; Founder of the Missionary Capuchin Sisters of Saint Francis of Assisi (Milan, Italy – Ceará, Brazil)
 Declared "Venerable": May 21, 2022
 Vítor Coelho de Almeida (1899–1987), Professed Priest of the Redemptorists (Minas Gerais – São Paulo, Brazil)
 Declared "Venerable": August 5, 2022
 Franz de Castro Holzwarth (1942–1981), Layperson of the Diocese of São José dos Campos (Rio de Janeiro – São Paulo, Brazil)
 Declared "Venerable": December 17, 2022
 Aloísio Sebastião Boeing (1913–2006), Professed Priest of the Congregation of the Sacred Heart of Jesus (Dehonians); Founder of the Marian Fraternity of the Sacred Heart of Jesus (Brazil)
 Declared "Venerable": February 23, 2023

Servants of God
 Pero Dias and 11 companions (d. 1571), Religious Professed Jesuits (2 priests and 10 consecrated religious); Martyrs (3 Portuguese and 9 Spaniards on board from the Canary Islands to Brazil)
 Francisco da Costa Pinto (1552–1608), Professed Missionary Priest of the Diocese of Tianguá; Martyr (Açores, Portugal – Ceará, Brazil)
 Vitória Nabo Correia Bixarxe [Vitória of the Incarnation] (1661–1715), Professed Religious of the Poor Clare Nuns; Mystic (Bahia, Brazil)
 Sepe Tiaraju (1723–1756), Layperson of the Diocese of Bagé (Rio Grande do Sul, Brazil)
 Antonio Gonçalves de Oliveira [Vital Maria] (1844–1878), Professed Priest of the Franciscan Capuchins; Archbishop of Olinda-Recife (Pernambuco, Brazil – Paris, France)
 José Antônio de Maria Ibiapina (1806–1883), Professed Priest of the Diocese of Guarabira (Ceará – Paraíba, Brazil)
 João Maria Cavalcanti de Brito (1848–1905), Professed Priest of the Archdiocese of Natal (Rio Grande do Norte, Brazil)
 Jerônimo de Castro Abreu Magalhães (1851–1909), Married Layperson of the Archdiocese of Sao Sebastiao do Rio de Janeiro (Rio de Janeiro, Brazil)
 Bento Dias Pacheco (1819–1911), Professed Priest of the Diocese of Jundiai (São Paulo, Brazil)
 Zelia Pedreira Abreu Magalhaes [Maria of the Blessed Sacrament] (1857–1919), Widow; Professed Religious of the Servants of the Blessed Sacrament (Rio de Janeiro, Brazil)
 Domingos Evangelista Pinheiro (1843–1924), Professed Monsegnior of the Archdiocese of Belo Horizonte; Founder of the Sisters Helpers of Our Lady of Pieta (Minas Gerais, Brazil)
 Antônio da Rocha Marmo [Antoninho] (1918–1930), Child of the Archdiocese of São Paulo (São Paulo, Brazil)
 José Silvério Horta (1859–1933), Professed Priest of the Archdiocese of Mariana (Minas Gerais, Brazil)
 Cícero Romão Batista (1844–1934), Professed Priest of the Archdiocese of Fortaleza (Ceará, Brazil)
 Domingos Chohachi Nakamura (1865–1940), Professed Priest of the Diocese of Presidente Prudente (Nagasaki, Japan – São Paulo, Brazil)
 Ignacio Martínez Madrid [Ignacio of the Blessed Sacrament] (1902–1942), Professed Monsegnior of the Augustinian Recollects; Apostolic Administrator of Labrea (Burgos, Spain – Amazonas, Brazil)
 Ambrósia Ana Sabatovycz (1894–1943), Professed Religious of the Sisters Servants of Mary Immaculate (Ukrainian Greek Catholic Rite) (Zhovkva Raion, Ukraine – Santa Catarina, Brazil)
 Giuseppe Calvi (1901–1943), Professed Priest of the Oblates of Saint Joseph (Cuneo, Italy – Paraná, Brazil)
 Luiz Gonzaga do Monte (1905–1944), Professed Priest of the Archdiocese of Natal (Pernambuco – Rio Grande do Norte, Brazil)
 Julius Aemilius de Lombaerde (1878–1944), Professed Priest of the Missionaries of the Holy Family; Founder of the Missionaries of Our Lady of the Blessed Sacrament, the Daughters of the Immaculate Heart of Mary, and the Sisters of Our Lady of the Blessed Sacrament (Kortrijk, Belgium – Minas Gerais, Brazil)
 Marciano Bernardes da Fonseca (1859–1946), Professed Monsegnior of the Archdiocese of Juiz de Fora (Minas Gerais, Brazil)
 Johann Baptist Reus (1868–1947), Professed Priest of the Jesuits (Bayreuth, Germany – Rio Grande do Sul, Brazil)
 Antonia Martins de Macedo (Cecília of the Heart of Mary) (1852–1950), Founder of the Franciscan Sisters of the Heart of Mary (São Paulo, Brazil)
 Anatólia Tecla Bodnar (1884–1956), Professed Religious of the Sisters Servants of Mary Immaculate (Ukrainian Greek Catholic Rite) (Galicia, Ukraine – Paraná, Brazil)
 Francisco Expedito Lopes (1914–1957), Bishop of Diocese of Garanhuns; Martyr (Ceará – Pernambuco, Brazil)
 Inocêncio López Santamaría (1874–1958), Professed Priest of the Mercedarians; Bishop of Sao Raimundo Nonato (Spain-Brazil)
 Honorina de Abreu [Maria José of Jesus] (1882–1959), Professed Carmelite Religious (Rio de Janeiro, Brazil)
 Humbertus Linden Jr. [Bruno] (1876–1960), Professed Priest of the Franciscan Friars Minor (Düsseldorf, Germany – Santa Catarina, Brazil)
 Vicenta Guilarte Alonso [Ildefonsa] (1879–1960), Professed Religious of the Daughters of Jesus (Burgos, Spain – Minas Gerais, Brazil)
 Lafayette da Costa Coelho (1886–1961), Professed Canon of the Diocese of Guanhães (Minas Gerais, Brazil)
 João dal Monte [Inácio of Ribeirão Preto] (1897–1963), Professed Priest of the Franciscan Capuchins; Bishop of Guaxupé (São Paulo – Minas Gerais, Brazil)
 Pierre-Louis-Marie Galibert (1877–1965), Bishop Emeritus of the Diocese of São Luiz de Cáceres (Tarn, France)
 Francisca Benicia Oliveira [Clemência] (1896–1966), Professed Religious of the Daughters of Charity of Saint Vincent de Paul (Ceará, Brazil)
 Alberto Fuger (1892–1970), Professed Priest of the Diocese of Oliveira (Bas-Rhin, France – Minas Gerais, Brazil)
 Petrus Canisius van Herkhuizen [Matheus] (1915–1973), Professed Priest of the Assumptionists (Nijmegen, Netherlands – São Paulo, Brazil)
 Antonio Machi [Gabriele of Frazzanò] (1907–1973), Professed Priest of the Franciscan Capuchins (Messina, Italy – Minas Gerais, Brazil)
 Antônio de Almeida Lustosa (1886–1974), Professed Priest of the Salesians of Don Bosco; Archbishop of Fortaleza (Minas Gerais – Pernambuco, Brazil)
 Maria Joanna Laselva [Maria de Lourdes of Saint Rose] (1910–1974), Professed Religious of the Order of the Immaculate Conception (Conceptionist Nuns) (Bari, Italy – São Paulo, Brazil)
 Rudolf Lunkenbein (1939–1976), Professed Priest of the Salesians of Don Bocso; Martyr (Lichtenfels, Germany – Mato Grosso, Brazil)
 Simão Cristino Koge Kudugodu [Simão Bororó] (1937–1976), Layperson of the Diocese of Barra do Garças; Martyr (Mato Grosso, Brazil)
 Lucia Eleonora Schiavinato (1990–1976), Consecrated laywoman; Missionary; Founder of the Secular Institute "Piccoli Rifugi" (Veneto, Italy)
 Alderigi Maria Torriani (1895–1977), Professed Monsegnior of the Archdiocese of Pouso Alegre (Minas Gerais, Brazil)
 Maria Milito [Leônia] (1913–1980), Founder of the Missionary Sisters of Saint Anthony Mary Claret (Salerno, Italy – Parana, Brazil)
 Libério Rodrigues Moreira (1884–1980), Professed Priest of the Diocese of Divinópolis (Minas Gerais, Brazil)
 Gabriel Paulino Bueno Couto (1910–1982), Professed Priest of the Carmelites of the Ancient Observance; Bishop of Jundiaí (São Paulo, Brazil)
 Eliseu Maria Coroli (1900–1982), Professed Priest of the Barnabites; Bishop of Guamá; Founder of the Missionaries of Saint Therese (Piacenza, Italy – Pará, Brazil)
 Othon Motta (1913–1985), Bishop of Campanha (Rio de Janeiro – Minas Gerais, Brazil)
 Joaquim Arnóbio de Andrade (1915–1985), Professed Monsegnior of the Diocese of Sobral (Ceará, Brazil)
 Adelaide Molinari (1938–1985), Professed Religious of the Daughters of Divine Charity (Rio Grande do Sul – Pará, Brazil)
 Cleusa Carolina Rody Coelho (Maria Anjos of Saint Joseph) (1933–1985), Professed Religious of the Augustinian Recollect Missionary Sisters; Martyr (Espírito Santo – Amazonas, Brazil)
 João Luiz Pozzobon (1904–1985), Married Permanent Deacon of the Diocese of Santa Maria; Member of the Schonstatt Movement (Rio Grande do Sul, Brazil)
 Ezechiele Ramin (1953–1985), Professed Priest of the Comboni Missionaries of the Heart of Jesus; Martyr (Padua, Italy – Mato Grosso, Brazil)
 João Benvegnú (1907–1986), Professed Monsegnior of the Dioces of Passo Fundo (Rio Grande do Sul, Brazil)
 Luso de Barros Matos (1901–1987), Professed Priest of the Diocese of Porto Nacional (Tocantins, Brazil)
 Maria Giselda Villela [Maria Imaculada of the Holy Trinity] (1909–1988), Professed Religious of the Discalced Carmelite Nuns (Minas Gerais, Brazil)
 Maria de Lourdes Benedicta Nogueira Fontão [Lourdinha] (1930–1988), Married Laywoman of the Diocese of Sao Joao da Boa Vista (São Paulo, Brazil)
 José Carlos Parra Pires (1954–1990), Professed Priest of the Diocese of Umuarama (Paraná, Brazil)
 José Gumercindo Santos (1907–1991), Professed Priest and Founder of the Society of "Joseleitos" of Christ; Founder of the Congregation of Saint Therese and the Congregation of the Divine Master (Sergipe – Bahia, Brazil)
 Rosita Paiva (1909–1991), Cofounder of the Josephite Institute (Amazonas – Ceará, Brazil)
 Tomás Vaquero (1914–1992), Bishop of São João da Boa Vista (São Paulo, Brazil)
 Angelo Possidio Carú [Angelo of Jesus Crucified] (1925–1995), Professed Priest of the Discalced Augustinians (Varese, Italy – Toledo, Spain)
 Angelo Frosi (1924–1995), Professed Priest of the Xaverian Missionaries; Bishop of the Abaetetuba (Cremona, Italy – Pará, Brazil)
 Maria de Lourdes Guarda (1926–1996), Laywoman of the Diocese of Jundiaí (São Paulo, Brazil)
 José Antônio do Couto (1927–1997), Professed Religious of the Congregation of the Sacred Heart of Jesus (Dehonians); Bishop of Taubaté (Minas Gerais – São Paulo, Brazil)
 Floripes Dornellas de Jesus [Lola] (1913–1999), Laywoman of the Archdiocese of Mariana; Mystic (Minas Gerais, Brazil)
 Hélder Pessoa Câmara (1909–1999), Archbishop of Olinda-Recife (Ceará – Pernambuco, Brazil)
 Nazareno Lanciotti (1940–2001), Professed Priest of the Vicariate o Rome; Fidei Donum Missionary in the Diocese of São Luiz de Cáceres; Member of the Marian Movement for Priests; Martyr (Rome, Italy – São Paulo, Brazil)
 Luigia Calliari [Ginetta] (1918–2001), Laywoman of the Diocese of Osasco; Consecrated Member of the Focolare Movement (Trent, Italy –  São Paulo, Brazil)
 Alberto Beretta (1916–2001), Professed Religious of Capuchin (Lombardia, Italy)
 Waldir Lopes de Castro (1931–2001), Professed Monsegnior of the Diocese of Sobral (Ceará, Brazil)
 Gilberto Maria Delfina (1925–2004), Professed Priest and Founder of Fraternity Jesus the Savior (Salvists) (São Paulo, Brazil)
 Maria Luiza Resende Marques [Tereza Margarida of the Heart of Mary] (1915–2005), Professed Religious of the Discalced Carmelite Nuns (Minas Gerais, Brazil)
 Luciano Pedro Mendes de Almeida (1930–2006), Professed Priest of the Jesuits; Archbishop of Mariana (Rio de Janeiro – São Paulo, Brazil)
 Léo Tarcísio Gonçalves Pereira (1961–2007), Professed Priest of the Sacred Heart of Jesus (Dehonians); Founder of the "Bethânia" Community (Minas Gerais – São Paulo, Brazil)
 Marcelo Henrique Câmara [Marcelinho] (1979–2008), Layperson of the Personal Prelature of the Holy Cross and Opus Dei (Santa Catarina, Brazil)
 Estevão Bettencourt (1919–2008), Benedictine Professed Monk (Rio de Janeiro, Brazil)
 Angelo Angioni (1915–2008), Professed Monsegnior of the Diocese of São José do Rio Preto (Nuoro, Italy – São Paulo, Brazil)
 Guido Vidal França Schäffer (1974–2009), Seminarian of the Archdiocese of São Sebastião do Rio de Janeiro (Rio de Janeiro, Brazil)
 Pedro Balzi (1926–2009), Professed Priest of the Diocese of Bergamo; Member of the Missionary Community of Paradiso; Fidei Donum missionary in the Archdiocese of Teresina (Lausanne, Switzerland – Piauí, Brazil)
 Zilda Arns Neumann (1934–2010), Married Laywoman of the Archdiocese of Curitiba (Santa Catarina, Brazil – Port-au-Prince, Haiti)
 André Bortolameotti (1919–2010), Professed Priest of the Congregation of Jesus the Priest (Trentino, Italy – São Paulo, Brazil)
 Cesare Sarafini [Michelangelo of Cingoli] (1908–2013), Professed Priest of the Franciscan Capuchins (Macerata, Italy – Sergipe, Brazil)
 Maria da Luz Teixeira de Carvalho [Adélia] (1922–2013), Professed Religious of Christian Instruction; Mystic (Pernambuco, Brazil)
 Paolino Maria Baldassari (1926–2016), Professed Priest of the Servites (Bologna, Italy – Acre, Brazil)
 Nemésio Bernardi (1927–2016), Professed Priest of the Capuchins (Rio Grande do Sul, Brazil – Rio de Janeiro, Brazil)

Candidates for sainthood
 Pedro Palácios (1500–1570), Professed Franciscan Religious; Missionary; Hermit; Founder of Penha Convent; Mystic (Castilla y León, Spain – Espírito Santo, Brazil)
 Adauto (unknown–1628), Indigenous Chief; Layperson catechumen; Martyr of the Missions (Rio Grande do Sul, Brazil)
 Mary of Solitude (1668–1719), Professed Religious of the Order of Santa Clara; Mystic (Bahia, Brazil)
 Francisco de Mendonça Mar [Francisco of Solitude] (1657–1722), Professed Priest of the Diocese of Bom Jesus da Lapa (Lisboa, Portugal – Bahia, Brazil)
 Margarida Dias Jardim [Margarida of the Column] (1662–1743), Professed Religious of the Order of Santa Clara; Mystic (Bahia, Brazil)
 João Barbosa [Fabiano of Christ] (1676–1747), Professed Religious Franciscan (Minho, Portugal – Rio de Janeiro, Brazil)
 Helena Maria [Helena of Holy Spirit] (1736–1775), Professed Conceptionist Religious; Co-Founder of the Monastery of Luz (São Paulo, Brazil)
 Francisco José das Chagas [Chaguinhas] (unknown–1821), Layperson of the Archdiocese of São Paulo (São Paulo, Brazil)
 Joana Angélica de Jesus (1761–1822), Professed Conceptionist Religious; Martyr (Bahia, Brazil)
 Anastacia  (1740–unknown), Slave Laywoman of the Archdiocese of Rio de Janeiro (Minas Gerais – Rio de Janeiro, Brazil)
 Germana Maria [Germana of Purification] (1782–1855), Professed Conceptionist Religious; Mystic (Minas Gerais, Brazil)
 Maria de Lima das Mercês (1800–1864), Laywoman of the Archdiocese of Salvador (Bahia, Brazil)
 Antônio Rodrigues de Paiva e Rios (1806–1875), Professed Monsegnior of Diocese of Valença (Minas Gerais – Rio de Janeiro, Brazil)
 Anna Rosa (1865–1885), Young Laywoman of the Archdiocese of Botucatu (São Paulo, Brazil)
 Corina Antonieta Pereira Portugal (1869–1889), Laywoman of Diocese of Ponta Grossa (Rio de Janeiro – Paraná, Brazil)
 Maria da Conceição Bueno (1854–1893), Laywoman of the Archdiocese of Curitiba (Paraná, Brazil)
 Antônio Vicente Maciel Borges [Antonio Counselor] (1830–1897), Layperson of the Dioces of Paulo Afonso; Prophet (Ceará – Bahia, Brazil)
 Inácio de Souza Rolim (1800–1899), Priest of the Diocese of Cajazeiras (Paraíba, Brazil)
 Anna Maria and companions [Martyrs of Alto Alegre] (d. 1901), 11 Professed Religious (3 Capuchin Priests, 1 Oblate Capuchin Religious men and 7 Capuchin women), 2 Franciscan Tertiaries and 200 Layperson of the Diocese of Grajaú; Martyrs (Maranhão, Brazil)
 Domingos da Transfiguração Machado (1824–1908), Professed Priest of the Benedictines (Bahia, Brazil)
 Maria Izilda de Castro Ribeiro (1897–1911), Child Laywoman of the Diocese of Angra (Póvoa de Lanhoso – Guimaraes, Portugal)
 Bartolomeu Taddei (1837–1913), Professed Jesuit Priest (L'Aquila, Italy – São Paulo, Brazil)
 Maria Magdalena do Espírito Santo de Araujo (1862–1914), Laywoman of the Diocese of Crato (Ceará, Brazil)
 Antônio Bento do Portão (1875–1917), panhandler Layperson of Archdiocese of São Paulo (Bahia – São Paulo, Brazil)
 Isabel de Bragança Bourbon (1857–1921), Married Laywoman of the Archdiocese of Rio de Janeiro; Brazilian Imperial Princess (Rio of Janeiro, Brazil – Seine-Maritime, France)
 Adelaide Elias Tahim (1882–1929), Married Laywoman of the Diocese of Tianguá (Bethlehem, Palestine – Ceará, Brazil)
 Petrúcio Correia (1927–1938), Child of the Archdiocese of Maceió (Alagoas, Brazil)
 Maria Teresa Setúbal [Teresinha] (1924–1938), Young Laywoman of the Archdiocese of São Paulo (São Paulo, Brazil)
 Ana dos Santos Arruda [Donaninha] (1895–1941), Married Laywoman of the Archdiocese of Fortaleza (Ceará, Brazil)
 Francisca Maria do Socorro (1930–1943), Young Laywoman of the Diocese of Crato (Ceará, Brazil)
 Antônio Marcelino (1900–1945), deficient Layperson of the Diocese of Assis (São Paulo, Brazil)
 Antônio Álvares da Silva [Orlando] (1913–1945), Professed Priest Franciscan; Brazilian Army Chaplain (Minas Gerais, Brazil – Bologna, Italy)
 Maria Zaira Cordova Penna (1933–1953), Young Laywoman of the Archdiocese of Santa Maria (Rio Grande do Sul, Brazil)
 Vanilda Sanches Béber (1943–1958), Young Laywoman of Archdiocese of Campinas (São Paulo, Brazil)
 Aída Jacob Curi (1939–1958), Young Laywoman of the Archdiocese of São Sebastião do Rio de Janeiro; Martyr (Rio de Janeiro, Brazil)
 Dolores de Jesus Camargo (1932–1959), Young Laywoman of the Diocese of Guarapuava (Paraná, Brazil)
 Manoelina Maria de Jesus (1911–1960), Laywoman of the Archdiocese of Belo Horizonte (Minas Gerais, Brazil)
 Maria Amida Kammers (1941–1961), Young Laywoman of the Archdiocese of Florianópolis; Martyr (Santa Catarina, Brazil)
 Maria Peregrina (unknown–1964), Laywoman of Diocese of São José dos Campos (São Paulo, Brazil)
 Maria Augusta da Silva (1951–1965), Child Laywoman of the Diocese of Iguatu; Martyr (Ceará, Brazil)
 Maria Elizabeth de Oliveira (1951–1965), Young Laywoman of the Archdiocese of Passo Fundo; Mystic (Rio Grande do Sul, Brazil)
 Joaquim Honório da Silveira (1879–1966), Professed Monsegnior of Archdiocese of Natal (Rio Grande do Norte, Brazil)
 Amália Aguirre Queija [Amalia of Jesus Flagellate] (1901–1977), Professed Religious of the Institute of the Missionaries of Jesus Crucified; Mystic (Galicia, Spain – São Paulo, Brazil)
 José Kehrle (1891–1978), Professed Monsignor of the Diocese of Pesqueira; Mystic (Baden-Württemberg, Germany – Pernambuco, Brazil)
 Maria Gomes de Oliveira [Maria of the Glory of the Eucharistic Heart] (1903–1986), Professed Religious Conceptionist (Minas Gerais, Brazil)
 Josimo Morais Tavares (1953–1986), Professed Priest of the Diocese of Imperatriz; Member of the Pastoral Land Commission; Martyr (Maranhão, Brazil)
 Antônio Sinibaldi (1937–1987), Professed Priest Franciscan (Lazio, Italy – Maranhão, Brazil)
 José Maria Prada (1928–1991), Professed Priest of the Redemptorists; Martyr (Alto Trás-os-Montes, Portugal – Pernambuco, Brazil)
 Maria Milza dos Santos Fonseca [Mãezinha] (1923–1993), Laywoman of Diocese of Rui Barbosa; Mystic (Bahia, Brazil)
 Ronaldo Pereira da Silveira (1970–1995), Young Layperson of Archdiocese of Fortaleza; Member of “Shalom” Catholic Community (Ceará, Brazil)
 Maria da Conceição Silva (1920–1999), Laywoman of the Diocese of Pesqueira; Mystic (Pernambuco, Brazil)
 José Erlei de Almeida (1969–2001), Professed Priest of the Diocese of Oliveira (Minas Gerais, Brazil)
 Dorothy Mae Stang (1931–2005), Professed Religious of the Sisters of Notre Dame de Namur; Martyr (Ohio, United States – Pará, Brazil)
 Beatriz Maria de Jesus Hóstia Seiffert (1923–2009), Professed Religious of the Order of the Immaculate Conception  (Acre - Ceará, Brazil)
 Hugolino Back (1926–2011), Professed Religious of the Franciscan Order (Santa Catarina, Brazil)
 Laura Motta (1919–2014), Professed Religious of the Congregation of the Marcelina Sisters (São Paulo – Minas Gerais, Brazil)
 Heley de Abreu Silva Batista (1974–2017), Laywoman of the Diocese of Janaúba; Martyr (Minas Gerais, Brazil)
 Henrique Soares da Costa (1963–2020), Bishop of Palmares (Alagoas – Pernambuco, Brazil)
 Romeu Trussardi Filho (1930–2021), Married Layperson of the Archdiocese of São Paulo (São Paulo, Brazil)
 Maria da Conceição Aparecida Rodrigues Trussardi [Maricy] (1935–2022), Married Laywoman of the Archdiocese of São Paulo (São Paulo, Brazil)
 Jonas Abib (1936–2022), Professed Monsignor of the Diocese of Lorena; Founder of the “Canção Nova” Community (São Paulo, Brazil)

See also
 Roman Catholicism in Brazil
 List of American saints and beatified people
 List of Canadian Roman Catholic saints
 List of Mexican Saints
 List of South American Saints
 List of saints of the Canary Islands
 List of Scandinavian saints

References
 
 "Hagiography Circle"
 "Ronaldo Pereira Virtual Museum''
 "Ronaldo Pereira Canonization Movement

 
Catholic Church in Brazil
Brazil

Saints
Saints